The Miller ministry was the combined Cabinet (formally the Executive Council of British Columbia) that governed British Columbia from August 25, 1999, to February 24, 2000. It was led by Dan Miller, the 32nd premier of British Columbia, and consisted of members of the New Democratic Party (NDP).

The Miller ministry was in office for six months of 36th Parliament of British Columbia, coinciding with its third session. Miller was Deputy Premier of British Columbia in the preceding Glen Clark ministry; following Glen Clark's resignation, the NDP caucus unanimously selected him to be the leader (and thus premier) while the party could organize a leadership election.

On September 21, 1999, Miller made a small cabinet shuffle: moving Gordon Wilson from finance to education, and Paul Ramsey from education to finance. Wilson had told the Premier that he could not devote his full attention to the budget while mounting a leadership campaign.

Following the election of Ujjal Dosanjh in the 2000 leadership election, the ministry was replaced by the Dosanjh ministry.

List of ministers

References

Citations

Sources

Politics of British Columbia
Executive Council of British Columbia
1999 establishments in British Columbia
Cabinets established in 1999
2000 disestablishments in British Columbia
Cabinets disestablished in 2000